The 1923 Southern Intercollegiate men's basketball tournament took place between teams of both the Southern Conference  and Southern Intercollegiate Athletic Association from February 27–March 3, 1923, at Municipal Auditorium in Atlanta, Georgia. The Mississippi Aggies won their first Southern Conference title. After MSU won the tournament, a celebration broke out in downtown Starkville. A bonfire was built, and when firemen arrived to put it out, students chopped up their water hose and even hit one of the firemen over the head with a bugle.

Bracket

* Overtime game

Championship

All-Southern tournament team

See also
List of Southern Conference men's basketball champions

References

1922–23 Southern Conference men's basketball season
Southern Conference men's basketball tournament
Tournament
Southern Intercollegiate men's basketball tournament
Southern Intercollegiate men's basketball tournament
Southern Intercollegiate men's basketball tournament